Whakatu is a rural community in the Hastings District and Hawke's Bay Region of New Zealand's North Island. A large industrial area is enclosed by a bend in the Clive River, and the closure of the freezing works in Whakatu in 1986 cost the region 2000 full-time and seasonal jobs. State Highway 2 and the Palmerston North–Gisborne Line pass through Whakatu.

Richard Tucker (1856–1922) was a notable resident of Whakatu; he owned the largest wool-scouring plant in the Hawke's Bay Region.

Demographics
It is part of the wider Karamu statistical area.

Whakatu had a population of 645 at the 2018 New Zealand census, an increase of 39 people (6.4%) since the 2013 census, and an increase of 54 people (9.1%) since the 2006 census. There were 183 households, comprising 333 males and 312 females, giving a sex ratio of 1.07 males per female, with 156 people (24.2%) aged under 15 years, 129 (20.0%) aged 15 to 29, 291 (45.1%) aged 30 to 64, and 66 (10.2%) aged 65 or older.

Ethnicities were 59.1% European/Pākehā, 58.1% Māori, 4.2% Pacific peoples, 2.3% Asian, and 1.4% other ethnicities. People may identify with more than one ethnicity.

Although some people chose not to answer the census's question about religious affiliation, 45.6% had no religion, 35.3% were Christian, and 11.2% had Māori religious beliefs.

Of those at least 15 years old, 33 (6.7%) people had a bachelor's or higher degree, and 129 (26.4%) people had no formal qualifications. 42 people (8.6%) earned over $70,000 compared to 17.2% nationally. The employment status of those at least 15 was that 270 (55.2%) people were employed full-time, 72 (14.7%) were part-time, and 21 (4.3%) were unemployed.

References

Hastings District
Populated places in the Hawke's Bay Region